Jacob M. Nachtigall (1874 – 1947) was an American architect active in Omaha and eastern Nebraska.  The surname is sometimes spelled Nachtigal.  He designed numerous Catholic churches and other buildings in Nebraska.  Nachtigall was born in Germany in about 1874 and came with his family to the U.S. in 1883.  He apprenticed under Thomas Rogers Kimball (one of few professional architects in the state at the time) during 1900–1908 and went independent in 1909.
A number of his works survive and are listed on the U.S. National Register of Historic Places.
Works include (with varying attribution as given in sources):
Father Flanagan House, off U.S. 6, Boys Town, NE (Nachtigall, Jacob M.), NRHP-listed
Immaculate Conception Church and School, 1024 S. 24th St., Omaha, NE (Nachtigall, Jacob), NRHP-listed
St. Anthony's Church and School, 514 W. Main St. and 103 N 6th St., Cedar Rapids, NE (Nachtigal, Jacob), NRHP-listed
St. Bonaventure Church Complex, off NE 14, Raeville, NE (Nachtigall, Jacob M.), NRHP-listed
St. Leonard's Catholic Church, 502–504 S. Nebraska St., Madison, NE (Nachtigall, Jacob M.), NRHP-listed
St. Mary of the Assumption Catholic Church, School and Grottoes, 336 W. Pine St., Dwight, NE (Nachtigal, J.M.), NRHP-listed.  The church, built in 1914, was designed by Nachtigal.
St. Michael's Catholic Church Complex, NE of Greeley Ctr., Spalding, NE (Nachtigall, Jacob M.), NRHP-listed
Swartz Printing Company Building, 714 S. 15th St., Omaha, NE (Nachtigall, Jacob), NRHP-listed
West Point City Auditorium, 237 N. Main St., West Point, NE (Nachtigall, J.M.), NRHP-listed

References 

American architects
Architects from Nebraska
German emigrants to the United States